NGC 3310 is a grand design spiral galaxy in the constellation Ursa Major.  It is a starburst galaxy and it is likely that NGC 3310 collided with one of its satellite galaxies about 100 million years ago, triggering widespread star formation.  It is thought to be located approximately 46 million light-years away from the Earth, and is thought to be about 22,000 light-years wide.

The ring clusters of NGC 3310 have been undergoing starburst activity for at least the last 40 million years.

Two supernovae have been discovered in NGC 3310. A second supernova, SN 2021gmj (mag.15.1, type II) was discovered March 2021.

References

External links
 
 
 Hubble's Ultraviolet Views of Nearby Galaxies Yield Clues to Early Universe
 The Scale of the Universe (Astronomy Picture of the Day 2012 March 12)

Peculiar galaxies
Intermediate spiral galaxies
Ursa Major (constellation)
3310
05786
31650
217
17890412